Brown Chimphamba is a Malawian academic, civil servant and diplomat. He is the former Permanent Representative to the United Nations. He was also the chairman of the commission which ran the 1993 referendum which ended the rule of Hastings Banda's Malawi Congress Party. He was also the Vice Chancellor of the University of Malawi.

Academic Freedom 2011

He was head of the Academic Freedom Commission in 2011, where democratically elected President Bingu Mutharika had a standoff with the lecturers at UNIMA. This was the result of a lecturer, Dr Blessings Chinsinga being summoned by the police Inspector General Peter Mukhito for comparisons Chinsinga drew in a political science class with regards to the Tunisian uprisings in 2011 that resulted in the overthrow of President Hosni Mubarak. It led to the firing of Dr Blessings Chinsinga, Jessie Kabwila-Kapasula, Gaston Kanchedzera, Edge Kanyongoro and Franz Amin. It also led to student protests at the University of Malawi. The six-man Commission of Inquiry, headed by Prof. Brown Chimphamba, was convened by Mutharika 'to define academic freedom, investigate the cause of the stand-off and propose measures to avoid future ones'.

Sources
 Opposition in Malawi Demands Ruler Yield Power The New York Times, 17 June 1993

References 

Year of birth missing (living people)
Living people
Malawian civil servants
Malawian diplomats
Permanent Representatives of Malawi to the United Nations
Academic staff of the University of Malawi
Vice-chancellors of universities in Malawi